SLUH may refer to:

 St. Louis University High School
 Saint Louis University Hospital